Mike Landrum (born November 6, 1961) is a former American football tight end. He played for the Atlanta Falcons in 1984.

References

1961 births
Living people
American football tight ends
Southern Miss Golden Eagles football players
Atlanta Falcons players